Reyhan Arabacıoğlu (born 1980 in Bulgaria) is a Turkish weightlifter competing in the 77 kg division.

He started weightlifting in İzmir, where he is a member of the weightlifting team of İzmir Büyükşehir Belediyespor.

Achievements
Olympics

World Championships

European Weightlifting Championships

Mediterranean Games

References

External links 
 

1980 births
Bulgarian Turks in Turkey
Bulgarian emigrants to Turkey
Living people
Olympic weightlifters of Turkey
Weightlifters at the 2004 Summer Olympics
Turkish male weightlifters
Medalists at the 2004 Summer Olympics
Olympic bronze medalists for Turkey
Mediterranean Games silver medalists for Turkey
Mediterranean Games medalists in weightlifting
Competitors at the 2005 Mediterranean Games
European Weightlifting Championships medalists
World Weightlifting Championships medalists